Red Dog: Superior Firepower, also known as simply Red Dog, is a shooter game released in 2000 for the Sega Dreamcast; it was developed by Argonaut Games.

Gameplay
The game is composed of six single-player missions, seven challenge missions, and numerous combinations of game types and maps in multi-player mode. The player controls the Red Dog, an armored all-terrain assault vehicle to fight the Haak, an alien race that has invaded Earth.

Development
Red Dog was one of the first third party titles developed for the Dreamcast outside of Japan. Jez San, the Managing Director of Argonaut Games, stated that Sega referred to them, No Cliché (developers of Toy Commander), Bizarre Creations (Fur Fighters), Red Lemon (Take the Bullet and The Simpsons: Bug Squad, both unreleased)  and Appaloosa Interactive (Ecco the Dolphin: Defender of the Future) as their "1.5 party developers, in reference to the fact that we were treated like in-house developers and given access to the early devkits....warts n' all!". He told GameFan magazine that when Sega approached them to develop for the Dreamcast "we asked our artists to go to town on what they thought a next-gen game might look like" with "no limits on the number of polygons and CPU power used and we then set about trying to faithfully reproduce that vision in reality".

San described their intent in designing the gameplay as "kinda Quake, meets Battlezone meets Star Fox...in a tank".

On the 26th of September 2022 the game's source code was released by the developers and published on the open source platform GitHub.

Reception

The game received above-average reviews according to the review aggregation website Metacritic. Jim Preston of NextGen called it "A fun, colorful 3D take on Moon Patrol that is best when played with some friends."

Notes

References

External links
 
 

2000 video games
Argonaut Games games
Commercial video games with freely available source code
Crave Entertainment games
Dreamcast games
Dreamcast-only games
Open-source video games
Sega video games
Software using the MIT license
Tank simulation video games
Third-person shooters
Video games developed in the United Kingdom
Multiplayer and single-player video games